Geoffrion is a surname. Notable people with the surname include:

Alan Geoffrion, writer and author of Broken Trail
Amédée Geoffrion (1867–1935), lawyer and politician in Quebec, Canada
Bernie Geoffrion (1931–2006), nicknamed Boom Boom, Canadian professional ice hockey player and coach
Blake Geoffrion (born 1988), American former professional ice hockey player
Christophe-Alphonse Geoffrion, PC (1843–1899), Canadian lawyer, professor, and politician
Dan Geoffrion (born 1958), retired professional ice hockey player
Félix Geoffrion, PC (1832–1894), Canadian notary and politician
Moira Geoffrion (born 1944), American sculptor
Scott Geoffrion (1965–2006), NHRA drag racing driver
Serge Geoffrion (born 1955), Quebec politician and journalist
Victor Geoffrion (1851–1923), Canadian politician

See also
Gefion (disambiguation)

French-language surnames